Mulvaney or Mulvany is a surname. Notable people with the surname:

Mulvaney
 Dick Mulvaney (b. 1942), English football player
 Dylan Mulvaney (b. 1996), American actress
 Elle Mulvaney (b. 2002), English actress
 Jimmy Mulvaney (1921–1993), Scottish football player 
 John Mulvaney (1925–2016), Australian archaeologist
 Maggie Mulvaney, political campaign worker, niece of Mick Mulvaney
 Mick Mulvaney (b. 1967), U.S. politician, Director of the Office of Management and Budget

Mulvany
 Dominic Mulvany (b. 1956), Irish singer-songwriter
 Edward Joseph Mulvany (1871-1951), Australian public servant
 George Francis Mulvany (1809–1869), Irish painter
 Isabella Mulvany (1854–1934), educator
 John Mulvany (1839-1906), Irish-American artist
 John Skipton Mulvany (1813-1870), Irish architect
 Josephine and Sybil Mulvany (1899-1967 and 1901-1983), New Zealand weavers
 Josh Mulvany (b. 1988), English football player
 Kate Mulvany (b. 1978), Australian playwright and actress
 Patrick Mulvany (1871-1951), Irish politician
 William Thomas Mulvany (1806-1885), Irish entrepreneur

See also
 Private Terence Mulvaney, fictional character in a number of short stories by Rudyard Kipling and one of the Soldiers Three, Learoyd, Mulvaney and Ortheris
 Mulvaney, the "perfect family" in We Were the Mulvaneys, 1996 novel by Joyce Carol Oates
We Were the Mulvaneys, TV movies based on the novel

Surnames of Irish origin